Kolab Jial is a town and Union council of Kingri Taluka, Sindh, Pakistan. It is located near Tando Masti by pass stop.

References

Populated places in Sindh